Miguel Ángel Atienza Villa (born 27 May 1999) is a Spanish footballer who plays for Burgos CF as a midfielder.

Club career
Born in Madrid, Atienza was a CF Fuenlabrada youth graduate. He made his first team debut on 29 January 2017, starting in a 0–0 Segunda División B away draw against CDA Navalcarnero.

On 27 April 2018, Atienza signed a four-year contract with SD Eibar, being immediately assigned to the farm team CD Vitoria in Tercera División. He made his professional – and La Liga – debut on 4 January 2020, coming on as a second-half substitute for Sergio Álvarez in a 0–1 loss at Valencia CF.

Atienza scored his first senior goal on 9 February 2020, netting the opener for Vitoria in a 3–0 Tercera División home success over CD Basconia. On 3 July, he renewed his contract until 2023.

On 8 July 2022, Atienza signed a two-year deal with Segunda División side Burgos CF.

References

External links

1999 births
Living people
Footballers from Madrid
Spanish footballers
Association football midfielders
La Liga players
Segunda División players
Segunda División B players
Tercera División players
CF Fuenlabrada footballers
CD Vitoria footballers
SD Eibar footballers
Burgos CF footballers